Edward Szostak (September 12, 1911 in Kraków – October 10, 1990 in Kraków) was a Polish basketball player who competed in the 1936 Summer Olympics.

He was part of the Polish basketball team, which finished fourth in the Olympic tournament. He played in two matches.

References

External links
profile

1911 births
1990 deaths
Polish men's basketball players
Olympic basketball players of Poland
Basketball players at the 1936 Summer Olympics
Sportspeople from Kraków
Polish Austro-Hungarians